David Wilder Jr. (3 May 1778 – 21 September 1866) was an American politician who served as the Treasurer and Receiver-General of Massachusetts and as the first Massachusetts Auditor.

References

State auditors of Massachusetts
State treasurers of Massachusetts
1778 births
1866 deaths
Massachusetts Whigs
19th-century American politicians